Albert Dubuisson (28 October 1918 – 21 February 1974) was a Belgian racing cyclist. He rode in the 1950 Tour de France.

References

1918 births
1974 deaths
Belgian male cyclists
Place of birth missing